Elmer C. Nitschke (May 20, 1911 – August 20, 1982) was a member of the Wisconsin State Assembly.

Biography
Nitschke was born on May 20, 1911, in Burnett, Wisconsin. He married Marjorie Sutton in 1934. He died in Beaver Dam, Wisconsin in 1982.

Career
Nitschke was a member of the Assembly from 1949 to 1970. He was a Republican.

References

People from Burnett, Wisconsin
1911 births
1982 deaths
20th-century American politicians
Republican Party members of the Wisconsin State Assembly